The Battle of Doctor Coss was an armed conflict in Mexico between the Gulf Cartel and the Los Zetas-Northeast Cartel in the municipality of Doctor Coss, Nuevo León.

The battle

After the split of Los Zetas from the Gulf Cartel in 2010, both the organizations started to fight each other for the control of the drug trade and the territories of the coast and for the border territories. From 2011 the Los Zetas Cartel had internal conflicts which are still ongoing that formed small rival factions, the most powerful faction is Los Zetas-Northeast Cartel formed in 2014. From his creation, the organization started fighting the Gulf Cartel and in the same time the other rival factions and  other cartels. Dr. Coss is a rural community located 60 kilometers from the Mexican border town Miguel Alemán, which together with other neighboring communities is literally a battlefield between Los Zetas-Northeast Cartel and Gulf Cartel. On 13 March 2021 the city was the scene of a violent battle between the two cartels in which about ten narco tanks were used. The battle lasted until the next day. The Gulf Cartel prevailed, destroying 5 armored vehicles and killing 10 Zetas.

See also
Infighting in Los Zetas
Mexican drug war

References

Doctor Coss
Organized crime conflicts in Mexico
Los Zetas
Gulf Cartel
Doctor_Coss